Pseudothysanoes is a genus of typical bark beetles in the family Curculionidae. There are more than 100 described species in Pseudothysanoes.

See also
 List of Pseudothysanoes species

References

Further reading

 
 
 

Scolytinae
Articles created by Qbugbot